The 2001 Men's Hockey Junior World Cup was the seventh edition of the Hockey Junior World Cup. It was held from 9–21 October October 2001 in Hobart, Australia.

India won the tournament for the first time by defeating Argentina 6–1 in the final. Germany won the bronze medal by defeating England 5–1 in the third and fourth place playoff.

Qualification
Each continental federation received a number of quotas depending on the FIH World Rankings for teams qualified through their junior continental championships. Alongside the host nation, 16 teams competed in the tournament.

 (defending champions)

Results
All times are local time (UTC+10:00)

Preliminary round

Pool A

Pool B

Pool C

Pool D

Medal round

Pool E

Pool F

Non-Medal Round

Pool G

Pool H

Classification matches

Thirteenth to sixteenth place classification

Crossover

Fifteenth and sixteenth place

Thirteenth and fourteenth place

Ninth to twelfth place classification

Crossover

Eleventh and twelfth place

Ninth and tenth place

Fifth to eighth place classification

Crossover

Seventh and eighth place

Fifth and sixth place

First to fourth place classification

Semifinals

Third and fourth place

Final

Awards

Statistics

Final standings

References

External links
Official FIH website

Hockey Junior World Cup
Junior World Cup
International field hockey competitions hosted by Australia
Hockey Junior World Cup
Sport in Hobart
Hockey Junior World Cup
Hockey World Cup